DWGV is the callsign used by both stations owned by Apollo Broadcast Investors in Angeles City:
 DWGV-AM (792 kHz), branded as GVAM 792.
 DWGV-FM (99.1 MHz), branded as GVFM 99.1.